Jean Sennep (1894–1982) was a French caricaturist and illustrator.

1894 births
1982 deaths
French caricaturists
French illustrators
Artists from Paris